The 8th New Hampshire Infantry Regiment was an infantry regiment that served in the Union Army during the American Civil War.

Service
The 8th New Hampshire Infantry was organized in Manchester, New Hampshire, and mustered in for a three-year enlistment on December 23, 1861, under the command of Colonel Hawkes Fearing, Jr..

The regiment was attached to Butler's New Orleans Expedition to March 1862. 1st Brigade, Department of the Gulf, to November 1862. Independent Command, Department of the Gulf, to January 1863. 2nd Brigade, 3rd Division, XIX Corps, Department of the Gulf, to September 1863.

The 8th New Hampshire Infantry ceased to exist in December 1863 when its designation was changed to the 2nd New Hampshire Cavalry.

Detailed service
Left New Hampshire for Boston, Massachusetts, January 24, 1862; then sailed for Ship Island, Mississippi, February 15, arriving there March 15. Duty at Ship Island until April 1862. Occupation of Forts Wood and Pike, Lake Pontchartrain, May 5. Moved to New Orleans and duty at Camp Parapet until October. Expedition to Lake Pontchartrain July 23 – August 2. Operations in District of LaFourche October 24 – November 6. Occupation of Donaldsonville October 25. Action at Georgia Landing, near Labadieville, October 27, and at Thibodeauxville October 27. Duty in the District of Lafourche until March 1863. Expedition to Bayou Teche January 12–14, 1863. Aboard the steamer Cotton January 14. Operations on Bayou Plaquemine and the Black and Atchafalaya rivers February 12–28. Operations against Port Hudson March 7–27. Teche Campaign April 11–20. Fort Bisland, near Centreville, April 12–13. Irish Bend April 14. Expedition from Opelousas to Chicotsville and Bayou Boeuff May 1. Expedition to Alexandria on Red River May 5–17. Movement from Alexandria to Port Hudson May 17–24. Siege of Port Hudson May 24 – July 8. Assault on Port Hudson June 14. Expedition to Niblett's Bluff May 26–29. Surrender of Port Hudson July 9. Moved to Baton Rouge, August 22. Sabine Pass Expedition September 4–11. Moved to Camp Bisland September 15 and duty there until October. Moved to Opelousas, then to Franklin, December 1863.

Casualties
The regiment lost a total of 360 men during service; 8 officers and 94 enlisted men killed or mortally wounded, 2 officers and 256 enlisted men died of disease.

Commanders
 Colonel Hawkes Fearing, Jr.

See also

 List of New Hampshire Civil War units
 New Hampshire in the American Civil War

Notes

References
 Dyer, Frederick H. A Compendium of the War of the Rebellion (Des Moines, IA:  Dyer Pub. Co.), 1908.
 Stanyan, John M. A History of the Eighth Regiment of New Hampshire Volunteers (Concord, NH: I. C. Evans, Printer), 1892.
Attribution
 

Military units and formations established in 1861
Military units and formations disestablished in 1863
Units and formations of the Union Army from New Hampshire
1861 establishments in New Hampshire